Ingush societies/shahars were  territorial associations of the Ingush based on the geographical association of several villages and intended for conditional administrative-territorial delimitation of the Ingush ethnic group. The formation and functioning of most of them dates back to the late Middle Ages (XVI-XIX centuries). During this period, their boundaries, number and names changed.

The names of societies mainly came from the names of the area of ​​their localization, that is, they were based on the geographical principle. Despite the fact that during this period the Ingush lived in relatively closed conditions of mountain gorges, which contributed to more demarcation in terms of territoriality than rallying around a single center, they retained the self-consciousness of a single ethnic group based on a common culture and a single language.

Ingush societies in the literature are sometimes called "shahars" ( — "society", "district") The term "shahar" meant in the ancient states of Western Asia the destinies into which they were administratively and territorially divided. Societies (shahars) of medieval Ingushetia were also territorial units.

History 
The collapse of the Alanian state in the 13th century and the outflow of its population to the mountains, entrenched to the east and west of the Darial by building fortresses, served as the basis for the formation of new ethno-territorial communities. Villages located in the mountainous zone were grouped mainly along local gorges, which contributed to their ethnopolitical consolidation into separate territorial societies/regions. By the end of the 16th century, apparently, the main territorial societies of the Ingush had already formed. Based on the data of Russian sources of the 16th-17th centuries, naming several territorial communities of the Ingush, it is concluded that in Ingushetia and in the XV century. there were approximately the same number of territorial societies, each of which united several villages.

Over time, the number and boundaries of societies changed, this happened as a result of migration processes of the Ingush population, including those associated with the return of the Ingush to the plane (plain). They began quite early, soon after Timur left the North Caucasus. At a very early stage, they were in the nature of individual military-political actions undertaken by the Ingush on the flat lands in order to counteract the consolidation of alien nomadic peoples on them. Separate episodes associated with this time are reflected in one of the Ingush legends, recorded in the 19th century. ethnographer Albast Tutaev, where representatives of the Ghalghaï Society of Mountainous Ingushetia appear. Also, the people's memory has preserved the most important episodes from the events associated with the development of flat lands. In particular, the legend recorded in the mountain village of Pkhamat by I.A. Dakhkilgov tells how eminent men from the territorial communities of mountainous Ingushetia gathered to unite the country. The participants decided that from now on they will all be referred to by a single name - "Ghalghaï", stop strife and begin to move out in an organized manner to the plane. Probably, these events were associated with the development of land in the upper reaches of the Sunzha and Kambileevka, where the oldest settlements of the Ingush in this area Akhki-Yurt and Angusht arose.

The change in the names and number of societies also occurred due to the transfer of rural governments from one village to another. So, for example, the Kist (Fyappin) society began to be called the Metskhal society, and the Ghalghaï society was divided into two - Tsorin and Khamkhin.

List of societies
- Dzherakhin society

- Fyappiy society

- Khamkhin society

- Tsorin society

- Galashian society

- Nazranian society

- Orstkhoy society

- Akkin society

- Malkhin society

Notes

References

Bibliography 
 
 
 
 
 
 
 
 
 
 
 
 
 
 
 
 
 
 
 

History of Ingushetia
Ingush societies